The 2018 Ontario Scotties Tournament of Hearts, the provincial women's curling championship for Southern Ontario, was held January 10 to 14 at the Whitby Curling Club in Whitby, Ontario. The winning team represented Ontario at the 2018 Scotties Tournament of Hearts in Penticton, British Columbia.

The defending champion Rachel Homan rink from Ottawa represented Canada at the 2018 Winter Olympics, and thus will not have the opportunity to defend their provincial crown. Had they not qualified for the Olympics, they still would not have had a chance to defend their title, as they would have represented Team Canada at the 2018 Scotties Tournament of Hearts. 

The event had a triple knock out format, rather than the traditional round robin event as was done in previous years. The number of qualified teams increased from 8 to 12.

Qualification Process
12 teams qualified from two regional qualifiers (three each), a challenge round (three teams), the winner of the Trophy competition, plus the top two southern Ontario teams in the CTRS standings (as of November 12).

Teams

The team lineups are as follows:

Knockout Draw Brackets
The draw is listed as follows:

A Event

B Event

C Event

Scores

Draw 1
January 10, 7:30pm

Draw 2
January 11, 9:30am

Draw 3
January 11, 2:30pm

Draw 4
January 11, 7:30pm

Draw 5
January 12, 9:30am

Draw 6
January 12, 2:30pm

Draw 7
January 12, 7:30pm

Draw 8
January 13, 10:00am

Playoffs

A vs B
Saturday, January 13, 3:00pm

C1 vs C2
Saturday, January 13, 7:00pm

Semifinal
Sunday, January 14, 9:30am

Final
Sunday, January 14, 2:30 pm

Qualification
East and west regional qualifiers will run November 24–27, 2017. Two teams from each region qualify.

East Qualifier
November 24–27 at the Lindsay Curling Club, Lindsay

Teams entered:

Kristina Adams (Peterborough)
Hailey Armstrong (Rideau)
Chrissy Cadorin (Royal Canadian)
Hollie Duncan (Royal Canadian)
Allison Flaxey (Granite)
Susan Froud (Westmount)
Jaime Gardner (Listowel)
Danielle Inglis (Dixie)
Cassandra Lewin (RCMP)
Erin Macaulay (Rideau)
Angie Melaney (Lindsay)
Erin Morrissey (Ottawa)
Brittany Pearce (Penetanguishene)

Brackets:

West Qualifier
November 25-26, 2017 at the St. Thomas Curling Club, St. Thomas

Teams entered:

Cathy Auld (Listowel)
Jacqueline Harrison (Mississaugua)
Heather Heggestad (Oakville)
Katelyn Wasylkiw (Unionville)

Brackets:

Trophy Championship
December 6-10 at the Midland Curling Club, Midland

Qualified teams:

Colleen Madonia (Thornhill)
Kelly Cochrane (High Park)
Kristy Russell (Elora)
Patricia Bandurka (Dixie)
Angie Melaney (Lindsay)
Dawn Butler (Rideau)
Brenna Cochrane (High Park)
Chrissy Cadorin (Royal Canadian)

Standings 
 

Tie-breaker: Cadorin 5-2 K. Cochrane

Regional qualifiers
Qualifiers in bold. Two teams qualify from each event for the provincial Trophy Championship.

Qualifier 1
November 17-19, Gananoque Curling Club, Gananoque

Teams entered:
Dawn Butler (Rideau)
Brenna Cochrane (High Park)

Qualifier 2
November 17-19, Port Perry Community Curling Club, Port Perry

Teams entered:
Angie Melaney (Lindsay)
Ashley Waye (Royal Canadian)
Colleen Madonia (Thornhill)
Wendy Finlday (Lindsay)

Qualifier 3
November 18, Penetanguishene Curling Club, Penetanguishene

Teams entered:
Brittany Pearce (Penetanguishene)
Chrissy Cadorin (Royal Canadian)
Kelly Cochrane (High Park)

Qualifier 4
November 17-19, St. Marys Curling Club, St. Marys

Teams entered: 
Amie Shackleton (St. Marys)
Kristy Russell (Elora)
Michelle Roach (Hamilton Victoria)
Patricia Bandurka (Dixie)
Sheri Smeltzer (Fergus)
Twyla Gilbert (Elmira)

Challenge Round
December 15, 2017 at the Leaside Curling Club, East York, Toronto

New teams:
Kirsten Marshall (Toronto Cricket)

References

Ontario Scotties Tournament of Hearts
Sport in Whitby, Ontario
Ontario Scotties Tournament of Hearts
Ontario Scotties Tournament of Hearts
January 2018 sports events in Canada